Ciara Grant (born 11 June 1993) is an Irish physician and professional footballer who plays as a midfielder for Heart of Midlothian of the Scottish Women's Premier League and for the Republic of Ireland national team. Grant has previously played for Raheny United, UCD Waves and Shelbourne of the Women's National League, and for Women's Premiership club Sion Swifts. Immediately prior to joining Hearts, Grant played for Rangers.

In 2010, Grant was a member of the Republic of Ireland under-17 squad who were runners-up in the 2010 UEFA Women's Under-17 Championship and quarter-finalists in the 2010 FIFA U-17 Women's World Cup. She won her first senior cap in November 2012. Outside of football Grant is a qualified medical doctor and worked as a lecturer for the Royal College of Surgeons in Ireland. She has also played Gaelic football for the Donegal county team.

Early years
Grant attended Woodlands National School in Letterkenny where her classmates included Mark English. Between 2005 and 2011 Grant attended the Loreto Convent Secondary School, Letterkenny, where she studied for her Leaving Cert. As a schoolgirl, Grant played association football for Lagan Harps and Kilmacrennan Celtic as well as representing her school. In 2009, she helped Kilmacrennan Celtic win the WFAI Intermediate Cup and in 2011 she was a member of the Loreto team that won the FAIS Senior Girls Cup, the top cup competition for girls' school teams in Ireland. Grant also played Gaelic football and basketball. Grant played for Donegal GAA in the 2010 All-Ireland Under-18 Ladies' Football Championship final. 
In basketball she played as a point guard for both her school and Letterkenny Blaze.

Club career

Raheny United
Between 2011 and 2014, Grant played for Raheny United in the Women's National League. During this time, Grant helped United win two successive league titles in 2012–13 and 2013–14. She also helped them win two successive FAI Women's Cups in 2012 and 2013. In the 2013 final against Castlebar Celtic at the Aviva Stadium, Grant scored United's opening goal in spectacular fashion. Without breaking stride, Grant controlled a dropping ball and let it bounce before lifting it over the Castlebar Celtic goalkeeper.

UCD Waves
Grant attended University College Dublin from 2011 until 2016. In her first year she studied physiotherapy before transferring to medicine. She graduated in 2017. In 2014–15 when UCD Waves entered a team in the Women's National League, Grant switched over from Raheny United. In November 2014, she appeared in her third consecutive FAI Women's Cup final, losing out 2–1 after extra-time to her former club. In addition to playing in the WNL, Grant also played for UCD at intervarsity level. In 2014 Grant was captain of the UCD team who won the WSCAI Futsal Cup, defeating the holders, I.T. Sligo, 3–2 in the final at the Mardyke Arena. Grant also scored for UCD in a 3–2 win over I.T. Sligo in the 2013–14 WSCAI Premier Division final. In 2015 Grant was captain of the UCD team that won the WSCAI Intervarsity Cup.

Sion Swifts
After a period away from football while she completed her medical studies, Grant joined Sion Swifts in their 2019 Women's Premiership campaign.

Shelbourne
Grant joined Shelbourne for the delayed and truncated 2020 Women's National League season. In 2021 Grant helped Shelbourne win the Women's National League title. She also scored in the 2021 FAI Women's Cup Final, which Shelbourne lost 3–1 to Wexford Youths.

Rangers
Grant joined Rangers on 28 January 2022. The six-month contract was Grant's first full-time professional deal, and made her the first Republic of Ireland international to sign for Rangers since Alex Stevenson in 1932. She helped Rangers finish the league season unbeaten and win their first ever Scottish Women's Premier League title.

Hearts
In June 2022 Grant agreed a transfer to Heart of Midlothian. She signed a one-year contract with an option for a further year, becoming only Hearts' second ever full-time professional female player after Emma Brownlie who signed the previous day.

International career

Youth
Grant has represented the Republic of Ireland at under-15, under-17, under-19, university and senior level. In 2010 she was a member of the Republic of Ireland U-17 squad who were runners-up in the 2010 UEFA Women's Under-17 Championship and quarter-finalists in the 2010 FIFA U-17 Women's World Cup. In December 2011 Grant was included in a Football Association of Ireland (FAI) scholarship programme for potential senior women's international players. Grant also represented Ireland at the 2013 and 2015 Summer Universiades.

Senior
Grant made her senior international debut in November 2012, in a 5–0 friendly defeat by the United States in Portland, Oregon, replacing Niamh Fahey in the 57th minute. National team coach Sue Ronan deployed Grant in an unfamiliar right-back role. Grant subsequently represented Ireland at the 2013 and 2014 Cyprus Cups and in their unsuccessful 2015 FIFA Women's World Cup and UEFA Women's Euro 2017 qualifying campaigns.

After showing good form for Shelbourne, Grant was recalled to the national team by Vera Pauw in June 2021. On 30 November 2021 she made another appearance in a record 11–0 2023 FIFA Women's World Cup qualification – UEFA Group A win over Georgia.

Personal life
Grant is a qualified medical doctor.  She returned to her native Letterkenny to volunteer at a local hospital soon after the outbreak of the COVID-19 pandemic.

Gallery

Honours

Association football
Individual
FAI International Football Awards Under-17 Women's International Player of the Year
 2008
Women's National League Team of the Season 
 2013–14
Raheny United
 Women's National League
Winners: 2012–13, 2013–14 : 2
Runners-up: 2011–12: 1
FAI Women's Cup
Winners: 2012, 2013: 2
UCD Waves/UCD
Women's National League
Runners-up: 2014–15
FAI Women's Cup
Runners-up: 2014: 1
WNL Cup
Runners-up: 2016: 1
WSCAI Intervarsity Cup
Winners: 2015 
WSCAI Premier Division
Winners: 2013–14 
WSCAI Futsal Cup
Winners: 2014 
Republic of Ireland U-17 
UEFA Women's Under-17 Championship
Runner Up: 2010
Loreto School
FAIS Senior Girls Cup
Winners: 2011 
Kilmacrennan Celtic
WFAI Intermediate Cup
Winners: 2009

Gaelic football
Donegal
Ulster Senior Ladies' Championship
Winner: 2018
All-Ireland Under-18 Ladies' Football Championship
Runner Up: 2010

References

External links

1993 births
Living people
Alumni of University College Dublin
Association footballers from County Donegal
People from Letterkenny
Republic of Ireland women's association footballers
Republic of Ireland women's futsal players
Republic of Ireland women's international footballers
Raheny United F.C. players
DLR Waves players
UCD Women's Soccer Club players
Sion Swifts Ladies F.C. players
Women's association football midfielders
Women's National League (Ireland) players
Women's Premiership (Northern Ireland) players
Donegal ladies' Gaelic footballers
Ladies' Gaelic footballers who switched code
Irish women's basketball players
Republic of Ireland women's youth international footballers
Irish medical doctors
Scottish Women's Premier League players
Expatriate women's footballers in Scotland
Irish expatriate sportspeople in Scotland
Shelbourne F.C. (women) players
Rangers W.F.C. players
Heart of Midlothian W.F.C. players